The interim cabinet of Fiji was appointed in January 2007, following the 2006 Fijian coup d'état.

The coup deposed the Qarase government on 5 December 2006. The coup leader, Commodore Frank Bainimarama reached an agreement with deposed President Ratu Josefa Iloilo whereby Iloilo would be reinstated as president and Bainimarama sworn in as interim Prime Minister. Bainimarama was duly sworn in on 5 January 2007. Eight cabinet ministers were appointed on 8 January and another six on 9 January; a fifteenth, Ratu Epeli Ganilau, was sworn in as Minister for Fijian Affairs on 15 January.

Initial cabinet

References

Cabinet of Fiji
Military coups in Fiji